The 1979–80 Eredivisie season was the 20th season of the Eredivisie, the top level of ice hockey in the Netherlands. Ten teams participated in the league, and the Heerenveen Flyers won the championship.

First round

Final round

External links
Nederlandse IJshockey Bond

Neth
Eredivisie (ice hockey) seasons
Ere